Dashihedong station is a station on Yanfang Line of the Beijing Subway. It was opened on 30 December 2017.

Station Layout 
The station has 2 elevated side platforms.

Exits 
There are 3 exits, lettered A1, A2, and B. Exit B is accessible.

Gallery

References 

Beijing Subway stations in Fangshan District